The 1879 Gansu earthquake occurred at about 04:00 local time on 1 July. It had an estimated magnitude of 8.0 on the  scale and a maximum perceived intensity of XI (Extreme) on the Mercalli intensity scale. The epicenter was in Wudu District in southern Gansu, close to the border with Sichuan. It caused widespread damage and killed an estimated 22,000 people.

Earthquake
The earthquake was preceded by foreshocks in the few days before the mainshock.

The meizoseismal area extends 70 km in a SSW-NNE direction and is 30 km across. The earthquake may have been caused by movement on the SSW-NNE trending Fanjiaba-Linjiang Fault. This fault correlates well with a 30 km long lineament seen on satellite images. The similarly oriented Hanan-Daoqizi-Maopola fault zone has also been proposed as a likely candidate.

The earthquake triggered many landslides and caused the formation of several natural dams 40 to 120 m high.

Damage
In Wudu city there were a total of 9,881 casualties, with many houses damaged and about half of the livestock killed. Large parts of the city walls were badly damaged and 60 temples were destroyed at Wanshou Hill. In Wenxian and the surrounding villages 10,792 people were killed. Many homes were destroyed and the city walls collapsed.

See also
 List of earthquakes in China
 List of historical earthquakes

References

1879 earthquakes
Earthquakes in Gansu
1879 in China
July 1879 events
1879 disasters in China